Glenea ossifera is a species of beetle in the family Cerambycidae. It was described by Karl Jordan in 1894.

References

ossifera
Beetles described in 1894